The 2004 NCAA Division I women's soccer tournament (also known as the 2004 Women's College Cup) was the 23rd annual single-elimination tournament to determine the national champion of NCAA Division I women's collegiate soccer. The semifinals and championship game were played at SAS Soccer Park in Cary, North Carolina from December 3–5, 2004.

Notre Dame defeated UCLA in the final, 4–3 (in a penalty kick shootout), to win their second national title. The game previously ended 1–1 after regulation and two overtime periods.

This tournament was notable for being the first in which North Carolina failed to qualify for the College Cup semifinals. The top-seeded Tar Heels lost in the Third Round to semifinalist Santa Clara.

The most outstanding offensive player was Katie Thorlakson from Notre Dame, and the most outstanding defensive player was Erika Bohn, also from Notre Dame. Thorlakson and Bohn, alongside nine other players, were named to the All-Tournament team. This was also the first All-Tournament team without a single player from North Carolina.

Thorlakson was also the tournament's leading scorer, with 4 goals and 6 assists.

Qualification

All Division I women's soccer programs were eligible to qualify for the tournament. The tournament field remained fixed at 64 teams.

Format
Just as before, the final two rounds, deemed the Women's College Cup, were played at a pre-determined neutral site. All other rounds were played on campus sites at the home field of the higher-seeded team. The only exceptions were the first two rounds, which were played at regional campus sites. The top sixteen teams, all of which were seeded for the first time ever, hosted four team-regionals on their home fields during the tournament's first weekend.

Records

Bracket

Bracket No. 1

Bracket No. 2

Bracket No. 3

Bracket No. 4

College Cup

All-tournament team
Danesha Adams, UCLA
Kendal Billingsley, UCLA
Erika Bohn, Notre Dame (most outstanding defensive player)
Candace Chapman, Notre Dame
Bristyn Davis, UCLA
Valerie Henderson, UCLA
Iris Mora, UCLA
Leslie Osborne, Santa Clara
Melissa Tancredi, Notre Dame
Katie Thorlakson, Notre Dame (most outstanding offensive player)
Romy Trigg Smith, Princeton

See also 
 NCAA Women's Soccer Championships (Division II, Division III)
 NCAA Men's Soccer Championships (Division I, Division II, Division III)

References

NCAA
NCAA Women's Soccer Championship
NCAA Division I Women's Soccer Tournament
NCAA Division I Women's Soccer Tournament
NCAA Division I Women's Soccer Tournament